Gao Jiarun (born 24 April 1995) is a Chinese footballer who plays for Tianjin Teda in the Chinese Super League.

Club career
Gao Jiarun joined Tianjin Teda's reserve team on 26 February 2016 from fellow Chinese Super League side Guangzhou R&F. He was promoted to first team squad in July 2016. On 7 May 2017, Gao made his senior debut in a 1–1 home draw against Liaoning FC as the benefit of the new rule of the league that at least one Under-23 player must be in the starting line-up and was substituted off by Li Yuanyi in the 16th minute.

Career statistics
.

References

External links
 

1995 births
Living people
Chinese footballers
Footballers from Shenyang
Guangzhou City F.C. players
Tianjin Jinmen Tiger F.C. players
Chinese Super League players
Association football midfielders